WQJC-LP (107.9 FM) is a radio station licensed to Quincy, Illinois, United States.  The station is currently owned by Quincy Not For Profit Jazz Corporation.

See also
 List of jazz radio stations in the United States

References

External links
 

QJC-LP
QJC-LP